Stephanie Branfield also known as Stef Branfield (born c.1993) is an English female lawn bowls international.

Bowls career
Branfield has represented England at bowls but came to significant prominence at the 2021 Bowls England National Finals when she won two English National titles representing the Clevdon Bowls Club and Somerset. The first title was the prestigious singles, where she beat Chris Mitchell of Wiltshire 21–16. A few days later she reached the final of the two wood singles, beating Katherine Hawes 16–10.

National titles
2021 Bowls England National Championships (Women's Singles Four Wood)
2021 Bowls England National Championships (Women's Singles Two Wood)

Family
Her father is former England international bowler Pip Branfield.

References

Living people
English female bowls players
1993 births